In Greek mythology, Aesyetes (Ancient Greek: Αἰσυήτης) was a Trojan hero and father of Alcathous. He was also given as the father of Assaracus and Antenor by Cleomestra. Aesyetes' tomb was the vantage point which Polites, son of Priam, used to scout the Greek camp during the Trojan War.

Notes

References 

 Dictys Cretensis, from The Trojan War. The Chronicles of Dictys of Crete and Dares the Phrygian translated by Richard McIlwaine Frazer, Jr. (1931-). Indiana University Press. 1966. Online version at the Topos Text Project.
 Homer, The Iliad with an English Translation by A.T. Murray, Ph.D. in two volumes. Cambridge, MA., Harvard University Press; London, William Heinemann, Ltd. 1924. Online version at the Perseus Digital Library.
 Homer, Homeri Opera in five volumes. Oxford, Oxford University Press. 1920. Greek text available at the Perseus Digital Library.

Trojans